Allueva is a municipality located in the Jiloca Comarca, province of Teruel, Aragon, Spain. According to the 2018 census the municipality has a population of 29 inhabitants.

It is located in the Sierra de Cucalón area. The sources of the Huerva River are close to this town.

See also
Jiloca Comarca
List of municipalities in Teruel

References

Municipalities in the Province of Teruel